Hálpata Tastanaki Preserve is located in Marion County, Florida and is part of the Southwest Florida Water Management District. Various sports and recreation opportunities are offered by the park including hiking, fishing, biking, horseback riding and picnicking.

A variety of plant communities occur on the property, including floodplain swamp and oak scrub along the Withlacoochee River and longleaf pine turkey oak sandhills occurring in upland areas. Recovering stands of oak scrub scattered amid the sandhill support the threatened Florida scrub-jay.

In addition to natural resources, the property supported a rich historical past. The preserve is named after Seminole leader Hálpata Tastanaki (Chief Alligator) who, along with Osceola, Jumper and approximately 1,000 warriors, took part in the largest battle of the Second Seminole Indian War in 1836. Included within the property is the site of the community of Stockton, established shortly after the conclusion of the Second Seminole Indian War.

Public ownership of the property provides for the long-term protection and enhancement of floodplain forests along the Withlacoochee River, isolated wetland systems and extensive upland areas with high rates of aquifer recharge.

References

Southwest Florida Water Management District reserves
Protected areas of Marion County, Florida